Zuccari may refer to:

 Zuccari (surname), Italian surname
 Palazzo Zuccari, Florence;
 Palazzo Zuccari, Rome

See also 

 Zuccaro